Pseudohypatopa anthracographa is a moth in the family Blastobasidae. It was described by Edward Meyrick in 1937. It is found in Assam, India.

References

Blastobasidae
Moths described in 1937